New Mandi Gharsana is a town in Sri Ganganagar district in Rajasthan state, India. Gharsana is located in southernmost part of Sri Ganganagar district.

References

Cities and towns in Sri Ganganagar district